61st Signal Regiment was from 1939-67 a communications regiment of the British Army, part of the Royal Signals.

61st Signal Regiment
In 1939 orders were issued for 3rd Anti-Aircraft Divisional Signals TA to be raised in Edinburgh and Glasgow, as part of 3rd Anti-Aircraft Division, Anti-Aircraft Command, and in 1940-41 the unit was actively engaged against German air attacks on Great Britain. In 1940 the Glasgow Company was absorbed into the newly raised 12th AA Divisional Signals, and in 1941 the remainder was converted into a mixed unit. In 1942 AA Command was reorganised and the unit was amalgamated into 6th AA Group (Mixed) Signals, covering Scotland and North East England.

Following demobilisation in 1945 it was reformed in 1947 with two companies in Edinburgh and two in Glasgow. It was known as 13th AA (Mixed) Signal Regiment TA, part of 3rd Anti-Aircraft Group.

In 1955 when AA Command was abolished the regiment was converted into Scottish Command (Mixed) Signal Regiment TA (part of Scottish Command). In 1957 it became 61st Signal Regiment TA and subsequently was allowed to add City of Edinburgh to its title in 1962.

In the reorganisation of the Reserve Army in 1967, it became part of 32 (Scottish) Signal Regiment (Volunteers), with responsibility for the provision of mobile communications throughout Scotland in an emergency.

References

External links
http://www.orbat.info/history/historical/uk/ta47.html - TA unit list 1947

Regiments of the Royal Corps of Signals
Scottish regiments
Military units and formations established in 1939
Regiments of the British Army in World War II
Military units and formations disestablished in 1967